Catacombs is a doom metal solo project of Xathagorra Mlandroth (born John Del Russi). The band's music was deeply inspired by Lovecraftian horror and the Cthulhu Mythos, often directly referencing it lyrically. The project followed Xathagorra's other endeavor Hierophant but was concluded when Xathagorra began releasing all his subsequent music under the name Xathagorra through his record label Xathagorra Industries. Xathagorra Industries re-released Catacombs albums in physical format as well as through Xathagorra's bandcamp page.

Discography

Albums 
 In the Depths of R'lyeh CD (Moribund Records 2006)

EPs 
 Catacombs MCD (Cthulhu Productions 2003)
 Echoes through the Catacombs MCD (Black-Metal.com 2004)
 Echoes through the Catacombs Re-release (Solitude Productions 2007)

References

External links 
 Official website

Musical groups established in 2001
American doom metal musical groups
Funeral doom musical groups
Heavy metal musical groups from Arizona
2001 establishments in Arizona